Stratonice may refer to:

 Stratonice (mythology), one of several Greek mythological women

Women of Ancient Macedonia 
 Stratonice (wife of Antigonus), the wife of Antigonus Monophthalmus
 Stratonice of Cappadocia, the wife of Ariarathes III of Cappadocia
 Stratonice of Libya, the wife of Archagathus of Libya
 Stratonice of Macedonia, the wife of Demetrius II of Macedon
 Stratonice of Pergamon, the wife of Eumenes II of Pergamum
 Stratonice of Pontus, one of the wives of Mithridates VI of Pontus
 Stratonice of Syria, the wife of Seleucus I Nicator and Antiochus I Soter

Music 
 Stratonice'' (opera), by Étienne Méhul

See also
 Stratonicea (disambiguation), several cities named after these women